Lucia Bronzetti and Isabella Shinikova were the defending champions but chose not to participate.

Alena Fomina-Klotz and Dalila Jakupović won the title, defeating Eudice Chong and Liang En-shuo in the final, 6–1, 6–4.

Seeds

Draw

Draw

References
Main Draw

Città di Grado Tennis Cup - Doubles